The discography of American rapper Ice-T consists of 8 studio albums, 10 compilation album, 51 singles, and 80 music videos. Ice-T has sold over 20 million albums in the US alone.  Ice has been known to collaborate with Ice Cube, 2 Live Crew, South Central Cartel, DJ Evil E, Everlast, Donald D, Kool Keith, West Coast All-Stars, Brotha Lynch Hung, 2Pac, Biggie Smalls, DJ Aladdin, Afrika Bambaataa, Too Short, Snoop Dogg, Public Enemy, Mobb Deep and many more.

Albums

Studio albums

Live albums

Compilation albums

Audio books

Extended plays

Singles

As lead artist

As featured artist

Guest appearances

Soundtrack appearances
 "Reckless" (1984 from Breakin')
 "Colors" (1988, from Colors)
 "Dick Tracy" (1990, from Dick Tracy)
 "Superfly 1990" (1990, from The Return of Superfly)
 "New Jack Hustler" (1991, from New Jack City)
 "Ricochet" (1991, from Ricochet)
 "Trespass" (1992, from Trespass) performed by Ice-T and Ice Cube
 "Disorder" (1992, from Judgment Night) performed by Slayer and Ice-T
 "Born to Raise Hell" (1993, from Airheads) performed by Motörhead, Whitfield Crane and Ice-T
 "Big Gun" (1995, from Tank Girl)
 "Below Utopia: The Lost Score" (1998, unused musical score without vocals from Below Utopia)
"Pimpin Ain't Easy" (Godfather) (2000, from WWF Aggression)
 "Get On Down" (2002, from Still More Bounce - A Tribute To Roger Troutman) performed by Ice-T, Xzibit, Kurupt, Mac Mall and King T

Videography

Video albums

Music videos

See also
Body Count Discography

References

Ice T
Discography
Discographies of American artists